Ayurveda Day, also known as National Ayurveda Day, is observed every year in India and worldwide on the occasion of the birthday of Dhanvantari, the Hindu god of medicine. The Puranas mentioned him as the god of Ayurveda. In 2016, the Government of India's Ministry of AYUSH declared the birth anniversary of Dhanvantari as National Ayurveda Day. The first Ayurveda Day was first celebrated on 28 October 2016.

History 
National Ayurveda Day was first observed in India on the 28th October 2016 to mark the day of Dhanwantri Jayanti (Dhanteras). It is observed to promote and globalise Ayurveda as one of the most ancient and holistic approaches to medicine globally. Various education institutes, colleges and hospitals organise free health camps and provide free medicines to celebrate Ayurveda Day.

In October 2016, on Ayurveda Day, the first All India Institute of Ayurveda was inaugurated by PM Narendra Modi in New Delhi. The government also honours people who contributed to Ayurvedic treatment and research on Ayurveda Day with 'National Dhanwantari Ayurveda Award' every year. The National Dhanwantari Ayurveda Awards consist of a citation, trophy (Statue of Dhanwantari) and cash prize of 5 Lakh.

In 2022, the All India Institute of Ayurveda, Delhi launched the 'Har Din Har Ghar Ayurveda Quiz' on the MyGov platform to create awareness about Ayurveda. In 2022, it was celebrated on  23 October. In 2021, the day was celebrated with a theme titled 'Ayurveda for Poshan (Nutrition) on November 2, 2021, to promote the Ayurvedic principles of wellness and healing.

See also 
 Ayurveda
 Dhanvantari
 International Day of Yoga

References 

Ayurveda
Observances in India